Bournemouth Gardens is a neighborhood in the eastern area of Kingston, Jamaica, off of Kingston Harbour. It was previously called Barn Pen. Bellevue Hospital for mental illness is located in Bournemouth Gardens.

Notable people
 Herman Sang grew up in Bournemouth Gardens.

References

Neighbourhoods in Kingston, Jamaica